
Szczytno County is a unit of territorial administration and local government (powiat) in Warmian-Masurian Voivodeship, northern Poland. It came into being on January 1, 1999, as a result of the Polish local government reforms passed in 1998.

As of 2006 its total population is 69,289, out of which the population of Szczytno is 25,680, that of Pasym is 2,550, and the rural population is 41,059.

Neighbouring counties
Szczytno County is bordered by Mrągowo County to the north, Pisz County to the east, Ostrołęka County to the south-east, Przasnysz County to the south, Nidzica County to the west and Olsztyn County to the north-west.

Administrative division
The county is subdivided into eight gminas (one urban, one urban-rural and six rural). These are listed in the following table, in descending order of population.

Historical population 
In 1825 Szczytno County (Kreis Ortelsburg) had 38028 inhabitants, including by mother tongue: 34928 (~92%) Polish and 3100 (~8%) German.

References

 
Szczytno